Community Christian School is the name of several private schools. These include

Community Christian School (Georgia), in Stockbridge, Georgia
Community Christian School (Bradenton, Florida)
Community Christian School (Tallahassee, Florida)

See also 
CCS (disambiguation)
Christian school
Community school (disambiguation)